The Kring Islands are a group of two islands and numerous rocks lying at the east side of Bell Bay along the coast of Enderby Land, Antarctica. They were mapped as a single island by Norwegian cartographers from air photos taken by the Lars Christensen Expedition, 1936–37, and named Kringla (the ring). Australian National Antarctic Research Expeditions air photos of 1959 show the feature to be more than one island.

See also 
 List of Antarctic and sub-Antarctic islands

References

Islands of Kemp Land